The Roman Catholic Diocese of Ondjiva is a diocese located in the city of Ondjiva in the ecclesiastical province of Lubango in Angola.

History
 August 10, 1975: Established as Diocese of Pereira de Eça from the Diocese of Nova Lisboa and Diocese of Sá da Bandeira
 May 16, 1979: Renamed as Diocese of Ondjiva

Special churches
The Cathedral of the diocese is Sé Catedral de Nossa Senhora das Vitórias (Cathedral Church of Our Lady of Victories) in Ondjiva.

Bishops
 Bishops of Ondjiva (Roman rite), in reverse chronological order
 Bishop Pio Hipunyati (since Nov 23, 2011)
 Bishop Fernando Guimarães Kevanu (Jan 30, 1988 - Nov 23, 2011)

Other priests of this diocese who became bishops
Dionísio Hisiilenapo, appointed Bishop of Namibe in 2011
Leopoldo Ndakalako, appointed Bishop of Menongue in 2019

See also
Roman Catholicism in Angola

Sources
 GCatholic.org

Roman Catholic dioceses in Angola
Christian organizations established in 1975
Roman Catholic dioceses and prelatures established in the 20th century
Ondjiva, Roman Catholic Diocese of